Yury Nikolayevich Vasilyev (October 12, 1939   — June 4, 1999)  was a Soviet and Russian stage and film actor. He is best known for film roles in The Journalist (1967) and Moscow Does Not Believe in Tears (1980). Sex symbol of the Soviet cinema.

Selected filmography
 Washington's Story (1960) as Buddy Brooks
 The Journalist (1967) as  Yuri Aliabiev
 Die Fledermaus (1979) as Prince Orlovsky
 Moscow Does Not Believe in Tears (1980) as  Rodion Rachkov
 We Are from Jazz (1983) as  jazz band leader
 Valentin and Valentina (1985) as Slava

References

External links

 

1939 births
1999 deaths
Russian Academy of Theatre Arts alumni
Soviet male actors
Russian male actors
Honored Artists of the RSFSR
People's Artists of Russia
Male actors from Moscow